Simlish is a fictional language featured in EA's Sim series of games.  It debuted in SimCopter (1996), and has been especially prominent in The Sims franchise, as well as in its spinoff MySims series. Simlish can also be heard in SimCity 4, SimCity Societies, SimCity (2013 version), and SimCity BuildIt but far less frequently. Civilized Creatures in Spore can also be taught to speak Simlish. It is also featured to an extent in Firaxis Games' Sid Meier's SimGolf.

Development
Simlish was created because Will Wright, creator of The Sims, knew that the game needed dialogue, but thought that using real-life languages such as English would cause the dialogue to be repetitive and would be expensive translating the entire dialogue Sims may say. He also decided that Simlish worked best as a "language" made up of gibberish words that could not be translated, so that the dialogue's meanings would be left open to the imagination of the player. Wright later commented that using a nonsense language turned out to be the right development choice, as people were capable of imagining it more realistically than a computer could simulate a real language. The actual sound of Simlish was improvised by voice actors Stephen Kearin and Gerri Lawlor.

One of Wright's biggest concerns while developing The Sims was that giving the characters actual dialogue would have made such dialogue extremely repetitive, because even if Wright had been able to fit five CDs' worth of voice clips into the game, players would eventually have started hearing the same voice clips over and over again. He found that this problem persisted even when he tried using Navajo, Ukrainian or Estonian, but that, because the gibberish of Simlish was so far removed from any existing human language, it was very difficult for players to detect repetition in it. The team went out to record hundreds of voice clips in Simlish, each with their own unique cadence and emotional nuance. Wright wanted the player to be able to tell whether a Sim is feeling flirtatious, upset, laid back, or tired, based entirely on their tone and tempo.

The only "agreed upon" Simlish phrase with an analog in real English is "sul-sul," (SOOL-sool, /'sul.sul/) which is a greeting phrase. There is no official recognition of this, but it is the only phrase consistently repeated by the Sims, and always as they are departing a building or social situation. It has given rise to several memes, jokes and tributes.

Music
Sims can listen to Simlish music on cheap boomboxes or fancy stereos; with the release of Hot Date, they gained the ability to listen to music on wall speakers on Community lots.

In The Sims: House Party and The Sims: Vacation, Sims sing Simlish campfire songs. They are sung to the tune of "She'll Be Coming 'Round the Mountain", "Michael Row the Boat Ashore" and "On Top of Old Smoky". Lyrics for these songs were posted on the official website. A free full-length soundtrack album for The Sims: Superstar has also been released for download (complete with cover art), with several tracks sung in Simlish.

For The Urbz: Sims in the City, the Black Eyed Peas provided music translated into Simlish, including their award-winning song "Let's Get It Started".

In The Sims 2: Open for Business, the 1985 song "Things Can Only Get Better" by Howard Jones is translated into Simlish as well as the 2005 song "Suffer Well" by Depeche Mode.

In The Sims 2: Pets, the song "The Compromise" by The Format is translated into Simlish.

In The Sims 2: University, the song "I Never Know" by Something for Rockets is translated into Simlish.

In The Sims 2 for PSP, Sims can listen to the Simlish versions of "Pressure" by Paramore, "Smile" by Lily Allen as well as "Good Day" by Tally Hall.

Katy Perry recorded a version of "Last Friday Night (T.G.I.F.)" in Simlish for the expansion The Sims 3: Showtime.

In The Sims 3: Pets, Kimbra sang "Good Intent" in Simlish.

In The Sims 4, there have been songs that have been covered in Simlish in the Seasons expansion pack.

As a part of The Sims 4: Parenthood soundtrack the Simlish version of "Don't Kill My Vibe", by Norwegian singer-songwriter Sigrid, was used.

As part of the 2018 The Sims 4 pop radio soundtrack, "Want You Back" by 5 Seconds of Summer was performed and translated into Simlish.

On June 10, 2021, a Simlish cover by Japanese Breakfast of their song "Be Sweet" was released for the Cottage Living expansion pack.

On November 15, 2022, Anitta released a single entirely in Simlish from her song "Practice" ("Prooshtis" in simlish), from the album Versions of Me, the song released for The Sims Sessions global campaign.

Written Simlish
Signs in The Sims games usually do not contain text, instead consisting entirely of graphics. For example, a pet shop sign in Unleashed displays a paw, a stop sign in Hot Date displays a white hand, and in The Sims 2 the sign for a grocery store depicts a cornucopia.

In The Sims, the headline The SimCity Times is visible on the daily newspaper, in English and written in a font similar to Comic Sans. 

In The Sims 2, most text is only distinguishable at very close zooms. On book covers, newspapers and Nightlife "Sims Must Wash Hands" sign, the lettering is all nonsense characters that bear about as much resemblance to Latin characters as they do to Cyrillic, although almost no actual characters from any known alphabet are used. When Sims are writing novels or term papers, dingbats from the Wingdings font appear as text on the screen. The notebooks used for homework contain writing composed of random lines.

In The Sims 2, Simlish words occasionally appear on television screens. They are written in the same Simlish alphabet described above, or using the font Wingdings to produce symbols like Aum or Zodiac signs. In The Sims 2: University, eight "SimGreek" letters appeared as signs intended for fraternity and sorority houses. University also contains the most unambiguous existence of actual English language in the whole The Sims 2 series; the words "Open house" are shown on a decorative noteboard on the top right announcement various times. It can only be seen at a very close zoom and is slightly garbled because of the DXT compression used. Most other appearances of English are logos for Maxis, Electronic Arts, or GameSpot. Also, the video games SSX 3, The Sims Bustin' Out, SimCity 4 and The Sims 3 (available exclusively in Mr. Humble's Computer object in FreeTime, brought by Mr. Humble, a Rod Humble Sim character), found on the Sims' computers and TVs have numbers and English letters. A rug from the H&M Fashion Stuff pack features the letters "H&M". The marketing of The Sims 2: FreeTime contains excerpts from phony "hobby magazines" with front cover text bearing some resemblance to the Latin alphabet. For instance, one magazine about car restoration has a title which can be read as Skitbil, literally meaning "Shit Car' or "Crappy Car" in Swedish.

In The Sims 3, the written form of Simlish became much more consistent than its predecessors. All decorative objects, in-game televisions, public buildings and clothing objects developed and released by EA and Maxis stayed consistent in their decorative usage. This continuity was occasionally broken, however, usually when content was released through sponsorship deals, such as with Katy Perry, Diesel and Toyota; this discontinuity was seen as unfavorable by some players, who believed it broke the immersion of the game for the sake of advertising.

In The Sims 4, Simlish is almost always used in many places where writing would normally be used, if not replaced by symbols.

When a vehicle arrives on the lot, the license plate shows Arabic numerals; similarly, police cars in the game have the numbers 329 on top of them. Helipads also have an H written on them, as in real life. When a Sim plays on electronic entertainment, "EA Games" is in English, but "Challenge Everything" is in Simlish.

Even though there is no official and consistent Simlish alphabet, many independent custom content creators have been using letters of the Greek alphabet instead of Latin ones. The Greek letters that replace the Latin ones are similar in form, sound or usage. For instance, the word "example" would be written as "εχαμπλε" or "εχαμρλε". The alphabet is consistent within a title but can shift between titles. For example, the Simlish in The Sims 3 and later has a more rounded look and an increased use of circles in the glyphs.

In The Sims Online, however, all text is in English. This is also the case in 2013's SimCity.

In a trailer for The Sims 3, a billboard in the town displays the English words Coming Soon, albeit with the letters rotated in different directions. The rest of the text on the billboard is in the usual Simlish, and is unreadable.

Outside The Sims 
Nearly all games in the Sim series use Simlish in the same manner that The Sims does. For instance, in SimCity 4, SimCity Societies and 2013's SimCity, citizens can be heard conversing if one zooms in sufficiently. In a similar manner, creatures created with a primate mouth in Spore will also converse in Simlish, and hovering above a city will trigger gibberish conversation from the masses below.  During the Civilization stage, this can be heard when the player selects active vehicles. Also, in other regional versions of the game Spore, Steve, an entity found in the center of the galaxy, will speak Simlish instead of the chosen language in international versions; although in the American version he speaks in the chosen language.

References

External links
 "Spot On: Simlish stylist Robi Kauker", Simlish music in The Sims 2: University
 Some songs in Simlish, official The Sims 2 website 
 Simlish Lessons, official The Sims website

Fictional languages
Gibberish language
Maxis Sim games
The Sims
Constructed languages introduced in the 1990s

da:The Sims 2#Simlish
de:Die Sims#Sprache